Panzeria is a genus of flies in the family Tachinidae.

Species
Panzeria melanopyga (Zimin, 1960)
Panzeria mira (Zimin, 1957)
Panzeria rudis (Fallén, 1810)
Panzeria sulciforceps (Zimin, 1960)
Panzeria truncata (Zetterstedt, 1838)
Panzeria vagans (Meigen, 1824)

References

Tachininae
Tachinidae genera
Taxa named by Jean-Baptiste Robineau-Desvoidy